Nada Personal may refer to:

 Nada personal (album), by Soda Stereo
 Nada personal (1996 TV series), 1996 telenovela
 "Nada Personal" (song), theme song to the TV series, by Armando Manzanero
 Nada personal (2017 TV series), 2017 telenovela